From March 8 to May 20, 1932, voters of the Republican Party chose its nominee for president in the 1932 United States presidential election. The nominee was selected through a series of primary elections and caucuses culminating in the 1932 Republican National Convention held from June 14 to June 16, 1932, in Chicago, Illinois.

As the year 1932 began, the Republican Party believed that Herbert Hoover's protectionism and aggressive fiscal policies would solve the then-ongoing Great Depression. Whether these policies were successful or not, President Hoover controlled the party and had little trouble securing a re-nomination.

The Primaries
Little-known former United States Senator Joseph I. France ran against Hoover in the primaries, but Hoover was often unopposed. France's primary wins were tempered by his defeat to Hoover in his home state of Maryland and the fact that few delegates to the national convention were chosen in the primaries.

Republican Candidates

Nominee

Withdrew during convention

Withdrew before convention

The Convention
Hoover's managers at the Republican National Convention, which met in Chicago between June 14 and 16, ran a tight ship, not allowing expressions of concern for the direction of the nation. He was nominated on the first ballot with 98% of the delegate vote.

The tally was spectacularly lopsided:

Both rural Republicans and hard-money Republicans (the latter hoping to nominate former President Calvin Coolidge) balked at the floor managers and voted against the renomination of Vice-President Charles Curtis, who won with just 55% of the delegate votes.

See also
1932 Democratic Party presidential primaries

References